was a Japanese painter and landscape artist. 

Sōami was the grandson and son of the painters and art connoisseurs Nōami and Geiami, respectively. He was in the service of the Ashikaga shogunate who is claimed to have designed the rock garden of the Ginkaku-ji. 

Unlike many of his contemporaries, Sōami's paintings were in the style of China's Southern School; some of his greatest pieces covered over twenty panels, and depicted Japanese landscapes using Chinese methods. His work was among the first nanga or Southern School work in Japan. Sōami is most known for his Landscape of the Four Seasons (Eight Views of the Xiao and Xiang Rivers) (at Archive.org).

See also
 Ryōan-ji: Zen temple whose rock garden may have been designed by Soami
 Seika: style of flower arrangement supported by Soami
 Daisen-in: Zen temple noted in part for screen paintings attributed to Soami

References
 Etō, Shun, Sōami•Shōkei (from the series Nihon bijutsu kaiga zenshū), Shūeisha, Tokyo, 1979.

1525 deaths
Japanese painters
Landscape artists
Year of birth unknown